Fugitive is a 2019 Nigerian film. It was directed and produced by Andy Boyo. Fugitive was centered around a cop who is accused of killing an investigative jounalist.

Cast 
The cast of the film includes Kate Henshaw, Daniel K. Daniel, Keppy Ekpenyong, Frederick Leonard, as well as actors from Zambia and Rwanda.

Plot 
The film takes place in a fictional United States of Africa, where various African nations have merged into one country.  A detective is accused of killing an investigative journalist and pursued by police and a syndicate. The film also highlights the negative effects of xenophobia and explores the theme of corruption.

References

2019 films
Nigerian crime drama films